The Indiana National Guard Governor's Cup is a rivalry cup awarded in the Indiana–Purdue rivalry. It was first introduced in the fall of 2001 as the Titan Series, renamed the Crimson & Gold Cup in the fall of 2004.  The name was changed to the Indiana National Guard Governor's Cup in the fall of 2013.  

A total of 20 points are available in the competition, one point for each sport in which both schools compete:

The schools accumulate points based on the results of head-to-head competition or standings at the Big Ten championships for sports that Purdue and Indiana do not play head-to-head. The program with the most points at the end of the year wins the trophy, although the series can end in a tie. 

If teams meet more than once in the regular season, points are split between the matches. For example, if basketball teams play twice, each game is worth 0.5 points. Sports played in series of more than 2 games such as baseball and softball use the series winner to award points as opposed to individual games. 

Four of the annual competitions have trophies at stake as well as the Cup points. Most famously, the football teams compete for the Old Oaken Bucket.  The three other trophies are among women's sports including the Golden Boot in women's soccer, the Monon Spike in women's volleyball, and the Barn Burner Trophy for women's basketball.

Competition results

See also
Indiana–Purdue rivalry

References

External links
Past Governor's Cup Results (IU)
Past & Current Governor's Cup Results (Purdue)

College sports rivalries in the United States
College sports rivalry trophies in the United States
2001 establishments in Indiana